There have been 19 coaches of the Cronulla Sharks since their first season in 1967.

List of coaches

See also

List of current NRL coaches
List of current NRL Women's coaches

References

External links

Sydney-sport-related lists
National Rugby League lists
Lists of rugby league coaches